Leaves' Eyes is a symphonic metal band from Germany and Norway. They were formed in 2003 by Liv Kristine, formerly the lead singer of Theatre of Tragedy, and the entire line-up of Atrocity. To date, the band has released eight studio albums, a single, six EPs, one live album and a DVD.

Most of Leaves' Eyes' lyrics, written by Liv Kristine until her departure in 2016, concern Norse mythology and the Viking Age. The melodic singing vocals of Liv Kristine and her replacement Elina Siirala are occasionally backed up by death growled vocals from Krull, identified under the vocal style Kristine refers to as "beauty and the beast".

History

Lovelorn (2003–2005)
Leaves' Eyes have often featured naturalistic themes in their music since the release of their 2004 debut album, Lovelorn. Many of the lyrics to this album were inspired not only by nature, but also by sagas and legends drawn from Norse mythology. The band was received well at Wave Gotik Treffen 2004, the band's stage premiere.

Every band member had previous professional experience in other musical endeavors for years before joining Leaves' Eyes, thus essentially making it a supergroup. Frontwoman Liv Kristine sang in the band Theatre of Tragedy from its inception in 1993 until her dismissal in 2003. This Norwegian band was one of the first to feature a female voice in the metal scene, and their club hit Tanz der Schatten became synonymous with the direction and expression of a whole musical genre. In addition, Liv Kristine was present in the pop music scene and sang the songs to TV hits such as Tatort and Schimanski. The supporting members of the band hail from the death metal band Atrocity.

Vinland Saga (2005–2009)

One year after Lovelorn, Leaves' Eyes released the follow-up album Vinland Saga in 2005, inspired by Viking Leif Eriksson. The album's first single, Elegy, charted in Germany for four consecutive weeks. Television station ProSieben used Elegy as the official song for the TV series NUMB3RS.

In addition to their studio endeavors, Leaves' Eyes also tours extensively. In the course of four years, the band traveled through four continents and 34 countries and played 222 concerts.  The Live DVD We Came with the Northern Winds: En Saga i Belgia entered the German DVD charts at number 11 in 2009. This exclusive package documented the history of the band and features the concert at the Metal Female Voices Festival in 2007. This headline show was performed with complex props, including a Viking longship on stage.

Njord (2009–2011)
Njord was released in 2009, continuing the band's success in the charts. The album's first single My Destiny soon became the successor to the anthem Elegy. Njord was critically acclaimed as "an epic masterpiece". The album was done in a much more modern style than those previous, and featured symphonic metal tracks of increasing complexity with the help of the Lingua Mortis Orchestra directed by Victor Smolski. Many of the lyrics were inspired by the English traditional "Scarborough Fair". The band's live performances were as equally successful throughout Europe and North America as their studio work. For the Special Fan Edition of Njord, Leaves' Eyes recorded the At Heaven's End EP in 2010.

Meredead (2011–2013)
One year later, Leaves' Eyes released their fourth studio album, Meredead. Produced by Alexander Krull, the artists combined folk elements from previous albums to inspire the mood of Meredead. 
The opening track, "Spirits' Masquerade", uses folk instrumentation to refine the album's varied sound. The tracks Étaín and Sigrlinn lyrically recount the mysticism of past cultures and are supported by uileann pipes. The album also features more traditional-sounding songs, such as Nystev and Kråkevisa. The latter makes use of the Scandinavian nyckelharpa, or keyed fiddle. Also present on the album is a cover of To France, an interpretation of the tragedy and emotion of Mike Oldfield's classic track. Maite Itoiz and John Kelly (Elfenthal), Carmen Elise Espenæs (Midnattsol), the Norwegian Anette Guldbrandsen, and Victor Smolski's Lingua Mortis Orchestra once again provide supporting vocals and instrumentation.

The EP Melusine in 2011 was a special release in co-operation with German Sonic Seducer Magazine.

Symphonies of the Night (2013–2015)
It was announced through an interview with Valkryian Music, that Leaves' Eyes had begun writing new material for their fifth studio album which they hoped to release spring 2013. On January 7, 2013 the band announced on their official Facebook page that the title of their fifth studio album would be Symphonies of the Night.

On March 23, 2013, Leaves' Eyes announced on their official Facebook page that vocal recording had begun, with the statement:
At the moment Liv Kristine is tracking vocals for the up-coming Leaves' Eyes album: 
"The recording sessions at Mastersound studios are so much fun, as well as being highly intense. 
Today I recorded an amazing and classically influenced new song. We are all very excited about the songs for the new album."

On May 9, 2013, the band announced that the vocal recordings were finished and that Alexander Krull had begun the mix of the album:
Good news from Mastersound Studio: The vocal recordings for all songs of our up-coming release "Symphonies of the Night" have just been completed. Moreover, Alex is already busy with the mix of the album. We have taken a great inspirational step since the production of "Meredead", both sound-wise and vocal-wise. It has been such a pleasure evolving in my singing techniques and knowledge and I thank my band members for "giving me an inspirational kick" when I needed to gain momentum behind the microphone. "Symphonies of the Night" is hauntingly dream-like and heavy to the core!'

The band premiered the first new song off of the album, titled "Hell to the Heavens", at Summer Breeze Festival.

Artwork for the new album was released on August 26, 2013.  A few days later, the band released a video saying that they would be performing in Metal Female Voices Fest 2013.  A teaser of the studio version of Hell to the Heavens was also in the video.

King of Kings and departure of Liv Kristine (2015–2016)
Leaves' Eyes stated that in 2015, that they would release a new album entitled King of Kings, and it would feature the London Voices choir and guest vocals by Simone Simons of Epica. It would also their first release on AFM Records after parting ways with their long-time label, Napalm Records.  King of Kings is a concept album that centers around the sagas of Norway's first king, Harald Fairhair (Harald Hårfagre).  In an interview with Sonic Cathedral webzine, Liv Kristine discussed her inspiration for the album:The nicest thing for me is that it is said in the sagas that Harald became the first king of Norway, after he won a battle that took place in one of the Norwegian fjords called Hafrsfjord.  You know, that is a very important place – not only for the history of Norway – but also for me, because I was born there.  So, this album is a concept album, but it's also a very PERSONAL album.  The first official video off King of Kings is for the track, "The Waking Eye", which was filmed in Norway (for the background scenes) and in Germany (for the action scenes). The Viking reenactment group, Værjaborg, supplied 40-plus members for the battle and action sequences. Leaves' Eyes considers "The Waking Eye" to be their most ambitious video to date.

On April 15, 2016, the band announced they had parted ways with lead-vocalist and co-founder Liv Kristine. Since then both parties have given different accounts about how the split happened with the band stating a decision on Kristine's departure was taken in January. While it was stated this had been a mutual decision, Kristine disputed this and indicated she was dismissed and it was not her decision. Legal proceedings have started.

Arrival of Elina Siirala and Sign of the Dragonhead (2016–2019)
On April 15, 2016, the band announced Finnish singer Elina Siirala as their new lead vocalist. On April 18, 2016, Siirala made her debut with the band at the Hammersonic festival in Jakarta. A tour edition of the album King of Kings appeared on June 3, 2016.

On October 7, 2016 the band released the EP "Fires in the North" which featured the a brand new song as well as three re-recorded songs from "King of Kings" with Siirala on vocals. Following the release of the EP the band embarked on a North American tour in support of Sabaton. On November 27, 2017 the band announced that the new album Sign of the Dragonhead. The same day that the album was announced, the title track was released as the lead single. The song "Across the Sea" was released as the album's second single on December 31, 2017 with an accompanying music video. The band released "Jomsborg" as the album's third single on January 11, 2018.

"Sign of the Dragonhead" was released on January 12, 2018. The band toured throughout Europe in support of the album and on August 30, 2018 released the song "Riders on the Wind" as the album's fourth and final single. The music video for the song showcased footage taken during the Sign of the Dragonhead Tour. On September 7, 2018, a tour edition of "Sign of the Dragonhead" was released which included the "Riders on the Wind" physical single.

The Last Viking and departure of Thorsten Bauer (2020–present)
The Last Viking was released on October 23, 2020. The album followed the trend towards folk metal and historical lyrics. On May 23, 2021, the band announced the addition of bassist Andre Nasso. On 29 December 2021, it was announced that Thorsten Bauer would leave the band by the end of 2021.

Band members
Current members
 Alexander Krull – keyboards, backing vocals (2003–present)
 Joris Nijenhuis – drums (2013–present)
 Elina Siirala – lead vocals  (2016–present)
 Micki Richter – rhythm guitars (2019–present)
 Andre Nasso – bass guitar (2021–present)

Live members
 Oliver Holzwarth – bass (2009)
 Niels Löffler – bass (2011–2015)
 Gijs Coolen – bass (2015–2016)
 Ferry Duijsens – bass (2016–2020)

Past members
 Martin Schmidt – drums (2003–2004)
 Chris Lukhaup – bass (2003–2007)
 Mathias Röderer – guitars (2003–2010)
 Liv Kristine Espenæs – lead vocals (2003–2016)
 Nicholas Barker – drums (2004–2008)
 Moritz Neuner – drums (2005–2007)
 Alla Fedynitch – bass (2007–2010)
 Seven Antonopoulos – drums (2008–2010)
 Roland Navratil – drums (2010–2012)
 J.B. van der Wal – bass (2010–2013)
 Sander van der Meer – guitars (2010–2015)
 Felix Born – drums (2012–2013)
 Pete Streit – guitars (2015–2019)
 Thorsten Bauer – guitars, bass (2003–2021)

Timeline

Discography

Studio albums

Live albums

EPs

Music videos

Awards
 Best DVD "En Saga I Belgia" Metal Female Voices Festival 2009

References

External links

Official website

German gothic metal musical groups
German symphonic metal musical groups
Norwegian gothic metal musical groups
Norwegian symphonic metal musical groups
Musical groups established in 2003
2003 establishments in Norway
2003 establishments in Germany
Musical groups from Stavanger
Musical groups from Baden-Württemberg
Napalm Records artists
Female-fronted musical groups
Articles which contain graphical timelines